The Bezhta (also Kapuchi) are an Andi–Dido people living in the Tsuntinsky region in southwestern Dagestan. In the 1930s along with the rest of the Andi-Dido peoples they were classified as Avars. However, some people identified themselves as Bezhta in the 2002 census of Russia. They speak the Bezhta language, but many of them also speak Avar, Russian or other Tsezic languages of their region. They numbered 1,448 in 1926. According to the Russian census in 2002, there were 6184 self-identified "Bezhtins", though the real number is probably higher.

History 
The territory of the Bezhtas was nominally part of the Avar Khanate. In 1806, the Bezhtas were incorporated into the Russian empire. Tight colonial control of the region was enforced during the 1860s and 1870s. During Soviet rule, the Bezhtas witnessed collectivization, urbanization, education mainly taught in the Russian language, and a erosion of Islam and traditional Bezhta culture.

Culture 
The Bezhta are primarily Sunni Muslim. The presence of Islam in the land of the Bezhta can be traced back to the 8th and 9th centuries. Most natives of the region were Muslim by the 17th century. 

The Bezhtas used to be livestock breeders. They mainly raised sheep, horses and oxen. The Bezhtas also practiced terrace farming and grew rye, wheat and other grains.

References

Wixman, Ron. The Peoples of the USSR, p. 28

 

Ethnic groups in Dagestan
Muslim communities of Russia
Peoples of the Caucasus
Muslim communities of the Caucasus